Lev-Tolstovsky District is an administrative and municipal district (raion), one of the eighteen in Lipetsk Oblast, Russia. It is located in the north of the oblast. Its administrative center is the rural locality (a settlement) of Lev Tolstoy. Population:  17,862 (2002 Census);  The population of Lev Tolstoy accounts for 52.7% of the district's total population.

References

Notes

Sources

Districts of Lipetsk Oblast